This article lists French composers who wrote for the harpsichord during the 17th and 18th centuries.

Chronology

1640–1710: Beginnings of harpsichord music in France 
Jean-Henri d'Anglebert (1629–1691)
Jacques Champion de Chambonnières (1601–1672)
Louis Couperin (c.1626–1661)
Louis-Nicolas Clérambault (1676–1749)
Charles Dieupart (1667–1740)
Jean-Nicolas Geoffroy (1633–1694)
Élisabeth Jacquet de la Guerre (1665–1729)
Nicolas Lebègue (1631–1702)
Gaspard Le Roux (1660–1707)
Louis Marchand (1669–1732)
Nicolas Siret (1663–1754)

1710–1789: Second period 
Claude-Bénigne Balbastre (1724–1799)
Joseph Bodin de Boismortier (1689–1755)
François d'Agincourt (1684–1758)
Jean-Odéo Demars (1695–1756)
Josse Boutmy (1697–1779; Flemish)
Bernard de Bury (1720–1785)
Jean-Joseph Cassanéa de Mondonville (1711–1772)
Michel Corrette (1707–1795)
Armand-Louis Couperin (1727–1789)
François Couperin (1668–1733)
Jean-François Dandrieu (1681–1738)
Louis-Claude Daquin (1694–1772)
Louis-Antoine Dornel (1680–1756)
Jacques Duphly (1715–1789)
Pierre Février (1696–1760)
Jean-Baptiste Forqueray (1699–1782)
Pierre-Claude Foucquet (1694–1772)
Jean-Adam Guilain (1680–1739; German)
Célestin Harst (1698–1778)
Christophe Moyreau (1690–1772)
Jean-Philippe Rameau (1683–1764)
Joseph Nicolas Pancrace Royer (1705–1755)
Simon Simon (1720?–1788)
Philippe-François Véras (fl. 1740)

Harpsichordists
Harpsichordists